Sean Robert Nienow (born March 9, 1968) is a Minnesota politician and former member of the Minnesota Senate. A member of the Republican Party of Minnesota, he represented District 32, which included all or portions of Anoka and Isanti counties in the northeastern part of the Twin Cities metropolitan area.

Early life, education, and career
Nienow grew up in Stacy, graduated from Chadashchay High School, then went on to Northwestern College in Roseville, where he majored in Business and Psychology. He also served as a major in the United States Air Force Auxiliary Civil Air Patrol. Prior to his first term in the Senate, he worked for American Express Financial Advisers for 14 years. He currently works as a process consultant and adviser.

Minnesota Senate
Nienow previously served in the Senate from 2003 to 2007 before being unseated by DFLer Rick Olseen in the 2006 general election. He successfully challenged Olseen for his old seat in the 2010 general election, garnering 56.01% of the vote to Olseen's 43.83%. Nienow was re-elected to District 32 in 2012.

During his previous term in the Senate, he served on the Agriculture, Veterans and Gaming, the Environment and Natural Resources, the Finance, and the Health and Family Security committees, and on the Environment and Natural Resources Subcommittee for Game and Fish, the Finance Subcommittee for the Early Childhood Policy and Budget Division, and the Finance Subcommittee for the K-12 Education Budget Division. His special legislative concerns include education, jobs, health care, and transportation.

Nienow lost the primary election for the Republican nomination for re-election in 2016, losing to Mark Koran.

References

External links

Project Vote Smart - Senator Sean Nienow Profile
Minnesota Public Radio Votetracker: Senator Sean Nienow

1968 births
Living people
Republican Party Minnesota state senators
University of Northwestern – St. Paul alumni
People from Anoka, Minnesota
21st-century American politicians
People from Chisago County, Minnesota